Eric Roscoe (27 December 1922 – 11 May 2000) was an Australian rules footballer who played with Melbourne in the Victorian Football League (VFL).

Family
The son of Ellen Emma Roscoe (1899-1948), later Mrs. Joseph Winton, Eric Roscoe was born at Clifton Hill, Victoria on 27 December 1922. He married Edith Lila Wood in 1950.

War Service
Roscoe enlisted in the Australian Army in November 1941 at the age of 18 and served in both New Guinea and the Solomon Islands until his discharge in 1946.

Football
Roscoe won the 1947 Central Goulburn Valley Football League best and fairest award, when playing for Shepparton Football Club. Roscoe then moved to Melbourne where he played a total of 17 games over two seasons in the Victorian Football League.

Notes

References
 
 
 B884, V330491: World War Two Service Record: Private Eric Roscoe (V330491), National Archives of Australia.

External links 
 
 Eric Roscoe, at Demonwiki.

1922 births
2000 deaths
Australian rules footballers from Melbourne
Melbourne Football Club players
Shepparton Football Club players
People from Clifton Hill, Victoria
Military personnel from Melbourne
Australian Army personnel of World War II